Virgin Care was a British private provider of community health and social services, commissioned by the National Health Service and local authorities in England. From 2010 the company was known as Virgin Care and was part of Virgin Group. In December 2021, it was acquired by Twenty20 Capital and rebranded as HCRG Care Group.

History
The company originated in around 2007 as the Assura Medical division of property company Assura Group. A majority share was purchased by Virgin Group in 2010, and by 2012 it was a separate company under the Virgin Care brand.

Until October 2012, each GP provider company was 50% owned by the surgery GPs and 50% by Virgin, and these companies were run by a board consisting of locally elected GPs and one Virgin representative. 358 surgeries were listed as being involved in mid-2012.

In October 2012 the company announced that it would be taking over all jointly owned GP-provider companies, in order to avoid any conflict of interest arising in respect of contracts with clinical commissioning groups. Following this change, the company made bids for contracts put out by these clinical commissioning groups, NHS England and local authorities, and has contracts stretching for more than a decade with a total potential value of £2bn.

In December 2021, the company was acquired for an undisclosed sum by Twenty20 Capital, a privately-owned investor in companies that provide workforce management and recruitment services. It was immediately rebranded as HCRG Care Group.

Profit 
The company claimed in 2018 to never have made a profit overall from its NHS services, and that it has invested its own money into the business, although accounts show that individual parts of the Group with NHS contracts have made profits.

Sir Richard Branson wrote in January 2018:Over the last 50 years, I have been fortunate to build many successful companies and do not want or intend to profit personally from the NHS. Indeed, I have invested millions in Virgin Care to help it transform its services for the better and to improve both the patient and employee experience.

Contrary to reports, the Virgin Care group has not made a profit to date. If and when I could take a dividend from Virgin Care (which would make us a profit over and above our overall investment), I will invest 100% of that money back into helping NHS patients young and old, with our frontline employees deciding how best to spend it.

In December 2021, the company's press release said: “Neither Virgin, nor its founder, has ever taken a penny from the business, committing instead to reinvest any returns back into the company and its frontline services."

Former contracts

Lyme Regis Medical Practice 
In 2012, Virgin Care won a contract to provide services in Dorset, at the Lyme Regis Centre, for five years. When the service was inspected by the regulator in August 2015, the Minor Injuries unit was found “not safe” by the Care Quality Commission because “patients were at risk of harm because systems and processes were not in place to keep them safe”. 
Inspectors returned in February 2016 and found improvements, and again in August 2016 when a ‘desk based’ inspection based on information the company provided was deemed sufficient to rate the practice ‘good’ in all areas. The service was eventually rated ‘good’ again by the CQC in October 2018, but inspectors again said it needed to do more and rated it ‘requires improvement’ for services for people with long term conditions. This contract ended in 2019 after a short extension, as the NHS merged it with another local GP practice.

Croydon Urgent Care Centre 
Virgin Care ran the Urgent Care Centre at Croydon University Hospital under a £6 million contract for three years from April 2012.

East Staffordshire 
The company won a seven-year contract worth £270 million for providing long-term and elderly care for about 38,000 people with long-term health conditions in East Staffordshire in March 2015, known as the "Improving Lives" programme. The commissioners, East Staffordshire Clinical Commissioning Group, said the programme was "focused on supporting the residents across East Staffordshire with long-term health conditions and older people who need extra support".  A report by the Care Quality Commission published in October 2019 rated the service 'good'. Virgin Care terminated its role as prime provider on 12 October 2018 after an 18-month-long dispute and went on to terminate the remaining part of the contract in May 2019.

Current contracts

Surrey 
Virgin Care won a contract to provide community health services in Surrey from 2012 until 2017. This includes the Jarvis Breast Centre in Guildford, which in October 2014 was subject to an investigation by North West Surrey Clinical Commissioning Group after 35 patients were not tested within two weeks of their GP referrals during April and July.  In 2017, Surrey's CCGs split the contract again and procured elements of it separately, with Virgin Care awarded some adult community services in the Surrey Heath CCG and North East Hampshire and Farnham CCG areas, as well as continuing to operate community dental services and wheelchair services.

In September 2019, the company was awarded an £85m contract to run a joint project with Frimley Health NHS Foundation Trust.

Bath and North East Somerset 
The company won a seven-year £700m prime provider contract to run health services in Bath and North East Somerset in 2016. This included running adult social work services, something that had not been done by a commercial organisation in the UK before. Forty-three social workers were transferred to the company. The service experienced significant IT issues during its first three months of operation which resulted in the cancellation of patient appointments, correspondence not being sent out and problems with updating patient records.

In 2021, as a result of this contract the company's Managing Director was noted to have been given a seat on the BSW Partnership Board.

In that year, the services provided were reported to include two community hospitals, outpatients' clinics, and school nursing and immunisation services. The organisation's contract was extended to 2027, taking it to the full 10 year term, at a slightly reduced £54.5m as a result of two services being brought back in house. Councillor Rob Appleyard told a scrutiny panel meeting that awarding the contract was "not universally accepted" and there was "continual distrust", but "Covid was the making of the relationship with Virgin Care".

West Lancashire 
In 2016, the company won a five year contract from West Lancashire CCG to provide adult community health services and urgent care services across the area. Commissioners said that the contract would lead to more "joined up" care. In May 2021, the service was rated good by the CQC in its first inspection.

Kent 
Community services in part of Kent, previously provided by Kent Community Health NHS Foundation Trust, were transferred to Virgin Care by Swale CCG and Dartford, Gravesham and Swanley CCG in January 2016 in a contract worth £18 million a year for the seven years from April 2016, with an option to extend by a further three years.

Lancashire County Council 
Lancashire County Council (LCC) awarded Virgin Care a five-year £104m contract in 2017 to provide public health services for children aged 0 to 19.

Two Lancashire NHS Trusts that had jointly bid for the contract contested the decision on the grounds that LCC had not properly followed the procurement process, and the High Court overturned the decision. In 2018, after LCC had re-evaluated the bids, in a process overseen by an independent panel of experts, it again chose Virgin Care. The decision was criticised by UNISON on the grounds that it would destabilise the NHS in Lancashire, that the gap between the two bids was only 0.07% and that the council was helping to privatise the delivery of key NHS services.

2012 legal challenge 
In October 2012, a mother of two children mounted a challenge in the High Court against Devon County Council's decision to award health and social care contracts to Virgin Care. The court allowed Virgin Care to keep the contract.

2017 lawsuit against the NHS 
In early 2017, Virgin Care began legal proceedings against NHS England, Surrey County Council and the county's six clinical commissioning groups, claiming there were defects in the procurement process which led to another provider winning an £82 million three-year children's community services contract.

The lawsuit was settled out of court with a £328,000 payment to Virgin Care, resulting in some controversy. This included a petition signed by over 100,000 people addressed to Richard Branson and Virgin Care, demanding that they "return the NHS’s money, and never sue the NHS again", as well as criticism in Parliament from Shadow Health Secretary Jonathon Ashworth, who claimed that the NHS is already "underfunded" without having to make payments to private health companies. Virgin Care stated that the money would be invested in services, rather than paid out to Virgin Group or Richard Branson.

See also
Private healthcare in the United Kingdom

References

External links

Care
British companies established in 2010
Health care companies established in 2010
2021 mergers and acquisitions
Health care companies of the United Kingdom
Private providers of NHS services